Winter is an American extreme metal band from New York City. They take their name from the Amebix song of the same name. The band performed at the 2011 Roadburn Festival in the Netherlands.

Members
Line-up
 John Alman - vocals, bass
 Stephen Flam - guitars (later of Thorn)
 Joe Gonclaves - drums (on demo)
 Frank Casey - drums (on Into Darkness)

 Jimmy Jackson - drums
 Chris Flam - video
 Anthony Pinnisi - keyboards

Discography
 Hour of Doom demo tape (1989)
 Into Darkness (1990)
 Eternal Frost EP (1994)

The album was re-released in 1992 by Nuclear Blast, and again in 1999 (including the EP material). The EP contained the songs from the demo and a bonus track.

Metal Mind Records announced in February 2008, that they would be re-releasing both the Into Darkness album, and Eternal Frost EP, as a limited edition digipak on May 13 that year. Metal Mind Records purports to have obtained a license from Nuclear Blast to re-issue this limited edition digipak.

Southern Lord reissued Into Darkness on vinyl in 2011 along with a 30-page booklet with fliers, photos, and more.

On July 8, 2013, The Village Voice blogger Jason Roche listed Into Darkness as No. 14 in the Top 20 Hardcore and Metal Albums to come out of New York City.

References

External links
 Official Facebook page

Death metal musical groups from New York (state)
American doom metal musical groups
American musical trios
Nuclear Blast artists